Federico Marietti (9 December 1925 – 9 July 1995) was an Italian basketball player. He competed in the men's tournament at the 1948 Summer Olympics and the 1952 Summer Olympics.

References

External links
 

1925 births
1995 deaths
Italian men's basketball players
Olympic basketball players of Italy
Basketball players at the 1948 Summer Olympics
Basketball players at the 1952 Summer Olympics
Basketball players from Rome